The Canon EOS 6D is a 20.2-megapixel full-frame CMOS digital single-lens reflex camera made by Canon.

The EOS 6D was publicly announced on 17 September 2012, one day before the start of the Photokina 2012 trade show.

It was superseded by the EOS 6D Mark II in 2017.

Features
There are 2 versions of EOS 6D. EOS 6D (N) and EOS 6D (WG):

The EOS 6D (WG) is the first Canon DSLR to feature GPS functions and built in Wi-Fi capabilities, which geotag images and allow files to be uploaded directly to Facebook, YouTube, or Canon Image Gateway; transferred to external devices; or sent to be printed on a Wi-Fi-enabled Canon printer. The Wi-Fi capabilities also allow remote control and viewing via many smartphones. These features are not available in the (N) version of the camera.

Weighing , the 6D is also Canon's smallest and lightest full-frame DSLR, comparable to the APS-C sensor 60D. The camera supports ISO settings from 50 to 102,400 which can be selected automatically or adjusted manually, an 11-point autofocus system, and an anti-glare  LCD screen. The center autofocus point has a sensitivity of −3 EV.

The BG-E13 battery grip, which was made to be used with the 6D, allows the use of six AA cells, or one or two LP-E6 batteries. The 6D has a maximum burst frame rate of 4.5 frames per second. Like all Canon DSLR full-frame cameras, the 6D does not have a built in flash due to the design of the viewfinder.

Image features 
 20.2 megapixel full-frame CMOS sensor.
 DIGIC 5+ image processor.
 Fluorine-coated low-pass filter.

Autofocus and metering 
 11-point autofocus sensors with 1 cross type sensor in center (x-type is sensitive down to −3 EV).
 TTL-CT-SIR AF with CMOS sensor.
 63-zone Dual Layer-silicon cell.
 AF Micro Adjust (+/− 20 steps).

ISO 
 ISO 100 –  ISO 25,600. Expansion down to ISO 50 and up to ISO 51,200 and ISO 102,400.

Shutter 
 30 s – 1/4,000 s (and bulb) is the shutter speed range.
 4.5 fps burst rate.

Ergonomics and functions 
 Optical pentaprism viewfinder with approximately 97% coverage (0,71× enlargement)
 Clear View TFT LCD screen (3 "/77 mm) with 720 × 480 pixels, 288 ppi (approximately 1,040,000 dots), resolution with dual anti-glare coating.
 Wi-Fi functionality.
 Metal alloy housing. (The top is made out of high-grade plastic.)
 Built-in GPS. This remains on when the camera is switched off, and quickly drains the battery if not deactivated via setting.

Video 
The movie image size can be set, as well as the frame rate per second, and compression method. Available modes:
 1920×1080 @ 24/25/30 fps: Full High Definition recording quality
 1280×720 @ 50/60 fps: High-Definition recording quality 
 640×480 @ 50/60 fps: Standard-definition recording quality

Firmware updates

Gallery

Reception 
Digital Photography Review have chosen Canon EOS 6D as one of the 20 most important cameras of the 2010s.

The Canon EOS 6D was the most commonly used camera in images to be shortlisted in the RMG Astronomy Photographer of the Year competition in both 2019 and 2020.

See also 
Canon EOS 6D Mark II
Canon EOS 5D Mark III
Canon EOS 60D

References

External links

Product page

6D
Cameras introduced in 2012
Full-frame DSLR cameras